Mr. Pasquale "Pat" Varsallona was born in Favignana, Italy, and later moved to Torino, Italy, the city where he started his soccer career as a youth player. Upon his arrival to the United States, he immediately began playing Semi-Professional soccer for various teams in New Jersey.

Career

He also had an illustrious collegiate career starring his first two years with national powerhouse Mercer County Community College, then playing his Junior and Senior years at Drexel University, where it was chosen as a First Team All-American for the Mid-Atlantic region. In 1976, he founded the Central Jersey Youth Soccer Association and in 1980, he established the Garden State Soccer League, a premier soccer league in New Jersey for men, women and youth with emphasis on the older age youth teams to prepare them for the adult environment.

Pat is involved in many administrative capacities: he has been a member of the United States Soccer Federation's International Games Committee and a member of the U.S.A.S.A.'s Rules Committee. He is currently the Chairman of the U20 National Tournament Committee He is also serving as the New Jersey Soccer Association Executive Director, a capacity he has held since 1984, as the Commissioner of Champions League Soccer, a Regional League of the USASA and as the Chief Executive Officer of the Garden State Soccer League.

Personal life
Varsallona has been married for 38 years to Ellen Volk, and together they have 2 boys: Derrick and Andrew.

Awards and honours
In 2013 Varsallona was the Livio D'Arpino Award recipient.

References
 
 
 
 

Year of birth missing (living people)
Living people
Footballers from Turin
Italian footballers
Drexel Dragons men's soccer players
Italian emigrants to the United States

Association footballers not categorized by position